As of the end of 2021, New Mexico had 4,001 megawatts (MW) of wind powered electricity generating capacity, responsible for 30% of electricity produced that year. Wind power in New Mexico has the potential to generate more than all of the electricity consumed in the state.

Wind resources 

The 250 MW capacity Roosevelt wind farm started operation in December 2015. The plant sells electricity to Southwestern Public Service.

Construction of the 298 MW El Cabo Wind Farm west of Encino was completed at the end of 2017. The Red Cloud 331 MW wind farm in south east New Mexico has over 40% capacity factor, and sends power to LADWP at $0.043/kWh for 20 years.

Installed capacity 
The following table compares the growth in wind power installed nameplate capacity in MW for New Mexico and the entire United States since 1999.

A 2010 study by the National Renewable Energy Laboratory showed that New Mexico has the potential to install up to 492,083 MW of wind power nameplate capacity, generating 1,644,970 GWh annually. For comparison, New Mexico consumed 23,060 GWh of electricity in 2016, and 20,639 GWh in 2005.

Wind generation

Source:

See also

Index of New Mexico-related articles
List of U.S. states by carbon dioxide emissions
List of wind farms in the United States
Outline of New Mexico
Solar power in New Mexico

References

External links

Wind Farms in New Mexico